The Columbus Blue Jackets are a professional ice hockey team based in Columbus, Ohio, United States. They are members of the Metropolitan Division of the Eastern Conference of the National Hockey League (NHL). The Blue Jackets began play in 2000 as an expansion franchise. As of May 2011, 173 players have appeared in at least one game with the Blue Jackets: 15 goaltenders and 158 skaters (forwards and defensemen).

Five players have served as the Blue Jackets' captain. Each NHL team may select a captain, who has the "sole privilege of discussing with the referee any questions relating to interpretation of rules which may arise during the progress of a game". Lyle Odelein was named the team's first captain in the inaugural season of 2000–01. Rick Nash, the second-most recent captain, is the team's franchise goal scoring leader. The captaincy is currently held by Boone Jenner.

Key
  Appeared in a Blue Jackets game during the 2021–22 season.
  Hockey Hall of Fame

The seasons column lists the first year of the season of the player's first game and the last year of the season of the player's last game. For example, a player who played one game in the 2000–01 season would be listed as playing with the team from 2000–01, regardless of what calendar year the game occurred within.

Statistics are complete to the end of the 2021–22 NHL season.

Goaltenders

Skaters

Notes

References
 Columbus Blue Jackets all-time roster on the Internet Hockey Database
 Columbus Blue Jackets all-time roster at legendsofhockey.net
 Columbus Blue Jackets stats leaders at the  Columbus Blue Jackets Official Site

 
Columbus Blue Jackets players
players